Thornaby Academy (formerly Thornaby Community School) is a coeducational secondary school located in Thornaby-on-Tees in the Borough of Stockton-on-Tees, North Yorkshire, England.

Background
The school was previously known as Bassleton School before being renamed Thornaby Community School in September 1999. Thornaby Community School converted to academy status in September 2010 and was renamed Thornaby Academy. The school is sponsored by Teesside University, Stockton Sixth Form College, Stockton Riverside College and Stockton-on-Tees Borough Council.

Thornaby Academy offers GCSEs and BTECs as programmes of study for pupils. The school also has a specialism in business and enterprise with a particular focus on digital media.

Notable alumni
Dean Wilkinson, comedy writer

References

External links
Thornaby Academy official website

Secondary schools in the Borough of Stockton-on-Tees
Academies in the Borough of Stockton-on-Tees
Teesside University
Thornaby-on-Tees